Spoilsport or spoil sport may refer to:
Spoilsport (Transformers)
"Spoilsport", a song on the 1996 Faye Wong album Fuzao
"Spoilsport", a 2016 episode of Shawn the Sheep
"Spoil Sport", a 1961 episode of Popeye the Sailor
"Spoil Sport", a 1998 episode of Elliot Moose